Calliostoma bellatrix is a species of sea snail, a marine gastropod mollusk in the family Calliostomatidae.

Some authors place this taxon in the subgenus Calliostoma (Ampullotrochus)

Description
The height of the shell attains 30 mm.

Distribution
This species occurs in the Arafura Sea.

References

  Willan R.C. 2002. Description of a new bathyal species of Calliostoma (Mollusca: Trochoidea: Calliostomatidae) from the Arafura seaway. The Beagle, Records of the Museums and Art Galleries of the Northern Territory, 18: 9–14
 Bouchet, P.; Fontaine, B. (2009). List of new marine species described between 2002-2006. Census of Marine Life.

External links
 

bellatrix
Gastropods described in 2002